The 2015 Music City Bowl was an American college football bowl game played on December 30, 2015 at Nissan Stadium in Nashville, Tennessee.  The 18th edition of the Music City Bowl began at approximately 6:00 p.m. CST and was broadcast nationally by ESPN.  It featured the Texas A&M Aggies from the SEC, and the Louisville Cardinals from the ACC. It was one of the final 2015–16 bowl games of the 2015 FBS football season. The game was sponsored by the Franklin American Mortgage Company and is officially known as the Franklin American Mortgage Music City Bowl.

Teams
The game is the fourth overall meeting between these two teams, with Texas A&M leading the series 3–0 going into the game. The last time these two teams met was in 1994 with Texas A&M beating Louisville with the score of 26–10.  This is the first time the two teams have met as members of the SEC and ACC; their last meeting came when Texas A&M was a member of the Southwest Conference and Louisville was an independent.

Texas A&M Aggies

Louisville Cardinals

Game summary

Scoring summary

Source:

Statistics

References

2015–16 NCAA football bowl games
2015
2015
2015
2015 in sports in Tennessee
December 2015 sports events in the United States